James Tice Ellis (May 6, 1956June 28, 2001) was an American computer scientist best known as the co-creator of Usenet, along with Tom Truscott.

Ellis was born in Nashville, Tennessee to Henry Ellis (an auditor and teacher) and Elsa Ellis. James Ellis grew up in Orlando, Florida. Before developing Usenet, Ellis attended Duke University. After graduating, Ellis worked for the Microelectronics Center of North Carolina in Research Triangle Park, N.C. He later worked as an Internet security consultant for Sun Microsystems. He was also Manager of Technical Development at CERT. He came up with the word Usenet.

Ellis and Truscott were awarded the 1995 USENIX Lifetime Achievement Award.

Personal life and death
Ellis and his wife, Carolyn, had two children.

He died of non-Hodgkin lymphoma, a form of blood cancer, at his home in Harmony, Pennsylvania on June 28, 2001. He was 45.

References

External links
Usenet creator Jim Ellis dies, Associated Press, on USAToday.com, June 29, 2001, retrieved on December 22, 2006.
Second Annual EFF Pioneer Awards

1956 births
2001 deaths
People from Nashville, Tennessee
Duke University alumni
American computer scientists
Usenet people
Deaths from non-Hodgkin lymphoma
Deaths from cancer in Pennsylvania